Agapanthia suturalis is a species of beetle in the subfamily Lamiinae, found in Sicily, Spain, the Near East, North Africa and Turkey. The species is black coloured with a yellow stripe. Males are larger than females. They fly from May to June.

References

suturalis
Beetles described in 1787
Beetles of Europe